Petar Pavlićević (born 10 May 2000) is a Montenegrin professional footballer who plays as a attacking midfielder for Iskra Danilovgrad.

International career
Pavlićević was called in Montenegro U17, Montenegro U18 and Montenegro U19 national team squads.

References

External links
 
 
 

Living people
2000 births
Montenegrin footballers
Montenegro youth international footballers 
Association football midfielders 
FK Vojvodina players
FK Kabel players
Serbian SuperLiga players
Serbian First League players